Viktor Rönneklev (born 16 August 1982) is a retired Swedish footballer who played as a defender.

References

External links

Viktor Rönneklev‚ at Elitefootball

1982 births
Living people
Association football defenders
Swedish footballers
Allsvenskan players
Superettan players
IFK Norrköping players
Jönköpings Södra IF players